Stan Mavis (born February 26, 1955), is an American former professional long-distance runner. 

Mavis attended Michigan State University on a Track and field Scholarship in 1973. After graduating, Mavis turned pro, running for the Athletics West Track Club. In 1980, Stan's time of 1:02:16 at the Natural Light Half Marathon broke the IAAF Half Marathon World Record. Mavis placed 10th in the 1980 US Olympic Trials despite the fact that the US boycotted the 1980 Summer Olympics . After Retiring, Mavis became involved in the sporting good business. In 2002, Mavis joined Brooks Running and served as the senior vice president of product there. He co-founded the Pearl Izumi brand and led the Brooks Sports and Sugoi Performance Apparel store. In 2009, Mavis was inducted into the Colorado Running Hall of Fame.

Competition record

References 

1955 births
Living people
Track and field athletes from Michigan
American male long-distance runners
Michigan State Spartans men's track and field athletes
World record setters in athletics (track and field)